Charleville is a commune in the Marne department in north-eastern France.

Personalities 
Anne Pérard, (1743–1829), history writer

See also
Communes of the Marne department

References

Communes of Marne (department)